Endo-beta-N-acetylglucosaminidase is a protein that in humans is encoded by the ENGASE gene.

Function

This gene encodes a cytosolic enzyme which catalyzes the hydrolysis of peptides and proteins with mannose modifications to produce free oligosaccharides. [provided by RefSeq, Feb 2012].

References

Further reading